Ababakar is a small village  in the Chach Valley of Hazro Tehsil in Attock District of Punjab Province, Pakistan

References

Villages in Pakistan